IL-25 or IL 25 can refer to:
 Interleukin 25
 Illinois's 25th congressional district, an obsolete district
 Illinois Route 25